The Invisible Bond is a lost 1919 American silent drama film directed by Charles Maigne and written by Charles Maigne based upon the novel The See-Saw: A Story of To-day by Sophie Kerr. The film stars Irene Castle, Huntley Gordon, Claire Adams, Fleming Ward, George Majeroni, and Helen Greene. The film was released on November 23, 1919, by Paramount Pictures.

Plot

Cast
Irene Castle as Marcia Crossey
Huntley Gordon as Harleth Crossey
Claire Adams as Leila Templeton
Fleming Ward as Curtis Jennings
George Majeroni as Wasson
Helen Greene as Imogene
Ida Waterman as Mrs. Crossey
Warburton Gamble as Otis Vale

References

External links 

 
 

1919 films
1910s English-language films
Silent American drama films
1919 drama films
Lost American films
Paramount Pictures films
Films directed by Charles Maigne
American black-and-white films
American silent feature films
1919 lost films
Lost drama films
1910s American films